Maxwell Peters (born 22 September 1955) is an Antigua and Barbuda athlete. He competed in the men's triple jump at the 1976 Summer Olympics.

References

1955 births
Living people
Athletes (track and field) at the 1976 Summer Olympics
Athletes (track and field) at the 1978 Commonwealth Games
Athletes (track and field) at the 1979 Pan American Games
Antigua and Barbuda male triple jumpers
Olympic athletes of Antigua and Barbuda
Commonwealth Games competitors for Antigua and Barbuda
Pan American Games competitors for Antigua and Barbuda
Place of birth missing (living people)